Babianka  is a village in the administrative district of Gmina Parczew, within Parczew County, Lublin Voivodeship, in eastern Poland.

References

Babianka
Kholm Governorate